Augment or augmentation may refer to:

Language
Augment (Indo-European), a syllable added to the beginning of the word in certain Indo-European languages
Augment (Bantu languages), a morpheme that is prefixed to the noun class prefix of nouns in certain Bantu languages
Augment, a name sometimes given to the verbal ō- prefix in Nahuatl grammar

Technology
Augmentation (obstetrics), the process by which the first and/or second stages of an already established labour is accelerated or potentiated by deliberate and artificial means
Augmentation (pharmacology), the combination of two or more drugs to achieve better treatment results
Augmented reality, a live view of a physical, real-world environment whose elements are augmented by computer-generated sensory input
Augmented cognition, a research field that aims at creating revolutionary human-computer interactions
Augment (Tymshare), a hypertext system derived from Douglas Engelbart's oN-Line System, renamed "Augment" by Tymshare
Augment (app), augmented reality software

Art
Augmentation (heraldry), heraldic modifications
Augmentation (music), the musical technique of lengthening or widening of rhythm or interval
Augment (album), an album by Erra

Mathematics
Augmented matrix, in mathematics, a matrix formed by placing two other matrices side-by-side
Augmentation (geometry), a way of enlarging a polyhedron
Augmentation (algebra), a certain algebra homomorphism
Augmentation ideal, in mathematics, an ideal in a group ring

Medicine
Breast augmentation, the breast implant and fat-graft mammoplasty procedures for correcting or enhancing breasts
Synaptic augmentation, a form of short term synaptic plasticity

In fiction
Nanobiotechnology augmentations, a feature in the computer game Deus Ex and Deus Ex: Invisible War
Prosthetic augmentations, a key feature in the computer game Deus Ex: Human Revolution and Deus Ex: Mankind Divided
Augments (Star Trek), genetically enhanced humans, in the Star Trek franchise
Transhumans in David Brin's post-apocalyptic novel The Postman

Other
Human enhancement